"At This Moment" is a song written by Billy Vera and recorded live by Vera and his band under the name Billy Vera & the Beaters in 1981, during a string of performances at the Roxy in West Hollywood (January 15–17) and featured on their self-titled live album Billy and the Beaters, released that year as the album's second single, on the American subsidiary of Japan's Alfa Records. The song is more notable for its second run on the charts years after its initial release, following its being featured on television's Family Ties series, after which the song became a number 1 hit in early 1987.

Original release 
When it was originally released as a single (Alfa 7005), as the follow-up to the album's first single, "I Can Take Care of Myself" (which had become the band's first Billboard Top 40 hit), "At this Moment" stalled on the Billboard Hot 100 chart at number 79 at the end of 1981.

Re-release
Five years after the original release, the studio version of "At This Moment" was included on several episodes of the NBC sitcom Family Ties during the 1985-86 season as the love song associated with Alex P. Keaton (played by Michael J. Fox) and his girlfriend Ellen Reed (played by Tracy Pollan, whom Fox eventually married in real life). Its exposure on Family Ties renewed interest in the song. Reissue label Rhino Records purchased the track from the band's original record label, Alfa (the American subsidiary of which was by then inactive), and re-released it in its original version as Rhino 74403. The tune then began a revived chart run, eventually hitting number 1 on both the Billboard Hot 100 and Adult Contemporary charts in January 1987. The song also hit the Billboard R&B Chart and the Billboard Hot Country Chart. As the song was starting to take off it came to the attention of Ron Carpentier President of RCI Music Promotion who was hired on the promotion of the song to radio and soon after the song hit the Billboard Hot Country Chart. It quickly sold over a million copies in the United States, becoming one of the last Gold-certified singles in the 45 rpm format.  The song crossed over to the R&B and country formats, reaching number 42. "At This Moment" would be the last song for 13 years to appear on the country charts and reach number one on the pop charts.

In an interview with Rachael Ray in 2007, Michael J. Fox good-naturedly stated, "Tracy and I couldn't get on the dance floor anywhere in the world in the first ten years of our marriage without them playing 'What did you think...' "

At the 2011 TV Land Awards held in New York City, Billy Vera performed "At This Moment" with the Family Ties cast in attendance, including Fox and Pollan.

Notable cover versions  
The song has been covered by many artists. Among the most prominent versions are ones by Tom Jones, Wayne Newton and Michael Bublé, the latter releasing the song in 2009 on his multi-Platinum album, Crazy Love.  Seth MacFarlane has performed the song twice on screen: he sang the song's opening lines in the character of Brian Griffin in the Family Guy episode "Brian the Bachelor", and as the title character in the 2015 film Ted 2. Jimmy Fallon and the Roots performed the song in 2018 on The Tonight Show Starring Jimmy Fallon, as part of the show's Cover Room series.

Charts

Weekly charts

Year-end charts

Certifications

References

1981 singles
1987 singles
Billboard Hot 100 number-one singles
Cashbox number-one singles
Live singles
Billy Vera songs
Songs written by Billy Vera
RPM Top Singles number-one singles
1981 songs
Rhino Records singles
Tom Jones (singer) songs